Francis Lemieux (born February 22, 1984) is a Canadian former professional ice hockey centre. Lemieux has played 249 regular-season games in the American Hockey League for the Hamilton Bulldogs and Grand Rapids Griffins. He has also played in Europe with several teams.

Lemieux was born in Sherbrooke, Quebec, Canada. He played his junior ice hockey with the Chicoutimi Sagueneens from 2001 through 2005. Not drafted by the NHL, Lemieux pursued a professional career with the Hamilton Bulldogs, then the top farm team of the Montreal Canadiens. Lemieux played two and a half seasons before being traded to the Detroit Red Wings in February 2008, joining their top farm team, the Grand Rapids Griffins.

Lemieux played for several teams in the American Hockey League, the ECHL and European leagues before finishing his career in Norway in 2015–16.

References

External links

1984 births
Chicoutimi Saguenéens (QMJHL) players
Connecticut Whale (AHL) players
Florida Everblades players
French Quebecers
Grand Rapids Griffins players
Graz 99ers players
Hamilton Bulldogs (AHL) players
HC TWK Innsbruck players
Sportspeople from Sherbrooke
Las Vegas Wranglers players
Living people
Manitoba Moose players
Vienna Capitals players
Ice hockey people from Quebec
Canadian ice hockey centres